Rush City Regional Airport  is a city-owned public-use airport located in Chisago County, Minnesota, one nautical mile northeast of the central business district of Rush City, a city in Chisago County, Minnesota, United States.

Facilities and aircraft 
It has one runway designated 16/34 with an asphalt surface measuring 4,397 by 75 feet (1,340 x 23 m). The FBO at the field is Hawk Aviation, Inc., where there is flight training, aircraft rental, a CATS testing center, vending services, and a pilot shop.

References

External links 
 City of Rush City
 Hawk Aviation
 

Airports in Minnesota
Buildings and structures in Chisago County, Minnesota